Maria Gabriela Best (born 1 December 1984) is an Argentine rower. At the 2008 Summer Olympics, she competed in the women's single sculls.  At the 2012 Summer Olympics, she competed in the Women's coxless pair with María Laura Abalo. Gabriela won two medals at the 2007 Pan American games and two gold medals (and a silver medal) at the 2011 Pan American Games.

References

1984 births
Living people
Pan American Games gold medalists for Argentina
Pan American Games silver medalists for Argentina
Pan American Games bronze medalists for Argentina
Argentine female rowers
Olympic rowers of Argentina
Rowers at the 2008 Summer Olympics
Rowers at the 2012 Summer Olympics
Rowers at the 2011 Pan American Games
Pan American Games medalists in rowing
South American Games gold medalists for Argentina
South American Games silver medalists for Argentina
South American Games medalists in rowing
Competitors at the 2010 South American Games
Medalists at the 2007 Pan American Games
Medalists at the 2011 Pan American Games
21st-century Argentine women